Hill of Beath Hawthorn Football Club are a Scottish football club from Hill of Beath, near Cowdenbeath, Fife. Formed in 1975, they play their home games at Keir's Park. Their colours are red with white flashes.

History 
The club played in the Kirkcaldy and District Amateur league until 1982 when they joined the Fife Junior League. The Haws won the Fife League eight times before becoming founding members of the East Region Super League in 2002. They spent all but one year in the Super League and finished runners-up three times, prior to their move to the East of Scotland League in 2018. A year later the club become full members of the Scottish Football Association, allowing them to enter the Scottish Cup for the first time in 2019–20, and also joined the Fife FA which enables them to compete in the Fife Cup.

Hill of Beath Hawthorn's greatest honour came in 1990, when they defeated Lesmahagow 1–0 in the final of the Scottish Junior Cup at Kilmarnock's Rugby Park.

The club were managed by Jock Finlayson from their formation in 1975 until the summer of 2015 when he was succeeded by Bobby Wilson. On 14 May 2017, Bobby Wilson left the club by mutual consent. On 20 May 2017, Kevin Fotheringham was named the new manager of the club. Kevin Fotheringham resigned as manager on 23 September 2019 after the Haws were knocked out the Scottish Cup by Gretna 2008.

Former club captain, John Mitchell, was appointed as manager of the club on 16 October 2019. John Mitchell resigned in September 2021

In September 2021, the club appointed former professional footballer Jason Dair as first-team manager. Dair, who made over 360 senior career appearances at clubs including Raith Rovers, Millwall, Dunfermline, Motherwell and Livingston, was joined by Lee Dair and Darrin Wright, both ex-Hill of Beath players, as first-team coaches, alongside Dave McNeely as goalkeeper coach.

Ground 

Hill of Beath Hawthorn play their home games at Keir's Park, situated on Hawthorn Crescent. The capacity of Keir's Park is 1,080 with the ground featuring covered enclosures of three sides of the pitch.

Rivalries 
The Haws share a fierce local rivalry with Scottish League One team Kelty Hearts.

Both clubs were founded the same year in 1975. The rivalry mainly stems from the close proximity of the two clubs and both being very successful "junior" sides within the Fife League. The Haws and Kelty would often exchange Fife league title wins from year to year, and also frequently meet in cup competitions.

Hill of Beath are currently two leagues below Kelty, competing in the East of Scotland Premier Division. However, they can still face each other in the Scottish Cup.

Current squad
As of 22 March 2022

Out on loan

Coaching staff

Season-by-season record

Senior

† Season curtailed due to COVID-19 pandemic - Hill of Beath Hawthorn finished second, based on the 'points per game' measure.
 Hill of Beath Hawthorn were awarded 2 points after Sauchie fielded a suspended player in their match on 27 July 2019.

Honours

Major Honours

Scottish Junior Cup
Winners: 1989–90

SJFA East Super League
Runners-up: 2002–03, 2010–11, 2011–12

Other honours
Fife Junior League winners: 1986–87, 1988–89, 1993–94, 1994–95, 1995–96, 1997–98, 1999–00, 2001–02
SJFA Fife District League winners: 2004–05
East of Scotland Junior Cup: 2014–15
Fife & Lothians (Heineken) Cup: 1995–96
Fife & Tayside Cup: 1995–96, 2000–01, 2001–02, 2002–03, 2004–05
Fife League Cup: 2004–05, 2007–08, 2008–09, 2010–11, 2011–12
Fife Junior (PSM) Cup: 1990–91, 1993–94, 1994–95, 1995–96, 2001–02, 2002–03, 2005–06
Cowdenbeath (Interbrew) Cup: 1988–89, 1989–90, 1991–92, 1993–94, 1994–95, 1996–97, 1997–98, 2000–01, 2002–03
Kingdom Kegs Cup: 1997–98, 1999–00
Laidlaw Shield winners: 1985–86, 1987–88, 1989–90
Fife Drybrough Cup: 1985–86

Notable former players
Tommy McDonald (M) (1948–49) Scotland B international

References

External links
 Official website

Football clubs in Scotland
Scottish Junior Football Association clubs
Association football clubs established in 1975
Football clubs in Fife
1975 establishments in Scotland
East of Scotland Football League teams
Hill of Beath